Giant Box is a double album by American arranger/conductor and composer Don Sebesky recorded in 1973 and released on the CTI label.

Reception
The Allmusic review states "This may have been Creed Taylor's most ambitious single project... Thankfully the musicmaking lives up to the billing. Everything that gave CTI its distinctive sound and identity is here -- the classical adaptations, elaborate orchestrations and structuring, pop-tune covers, plenty of room for the star soloists to stretch out in a combo format... Giant Box still ranks as a sensational coup and a reminder of how potent CTI was at its peak". All About Jazz reviewer Dan Bilwasky said "While Giant Box is indicative of the bigger-is-better approach of the times, it also serves as a benchmark for creativity in arranging and composition, and helps to place Sebesky's talents in the proper light".

Track listing
All compositions by Don Sebesky except where noted
 "Firebird/Birds of Fire" (Igor Stravinsky/John McLaughlin) - 13:57 
 "Song to a Seagull" (Joni Mitchell) - 5:49 
 "Free as a Bird" - 8:16 
 "Psalm 150" (Jimmy Webb) - 8:10 
 "Vocalise" (Sergei Rachmaninoff) - 5:40 
 "Fly/Circles" - 9:49 
 "Semi-Tough" - 7:50

Personnel
Don Sebesky - electric piano, organ, clavinet, accordion, arranger, conductor
Freddie Hubbard - trumpet
Grover Washington, Jr. - alto saxophone
George Benson - electric guitar
Airto Moreira - percussion
Milt Jackson - vibraphone
Jackie Cain, Roy Kral - vocals
Paul Desmond - alto saxophone
Hubert Laws - soprano saxophone, flute
Joe Farrell - soprano saxophone
Ron Carter - bass, electric bass, piccolo bass
Bob James - organ
Billy Cobham, Jack DeJohnette - drums
Randy Brecker, Alan Rubin, Joe Shepley - trumpet, flugelhorn
Garnett Brown - trombone
Wayne Andre, Warren Covington - trombone, baritone horn
Paul Faulise, Alan Raph - bass trombone, baritone horn
Jim Buffington, Earl Chapin - French horn
Tony Price - tuba
Walt Levinsky - tenor saxophone, clarinet
Phil Bodner - soprano saxophone, clarinet, flute, piccolo
George Marge - soprano saxophone, baritone saxophone, clarinet, flute, oboe, English horn
Romeo Penque - soprano saxophone, clarinet, flute, piccolo, oboe, English horn 
Rubens Bassini - conga 
Dave Friedman, Phil Kraus, Ralph MacDonald, Airto Moreira - percussion 
Alfred Brown, Harry Cykman, Max Ellen, Paul Gershman, Harry Glickman, Emanuel Green, Harold Kohon, Charles Libove, Harry Lookofsky, Joe Malin, David Nadien, Gene Orloff, Elliot Rosoff, Irving Spice - violin
Seymour Barab, Charles McCracken, George Ricci, Alan Shulman - cello
Homer Mensch - bass
Margaret Ross - harp
Lani Groves, Carl Caldwell, Tasha Thomas - vocals
Bob Ciano - album design

References

CTI Records albums
Don Sebesky albums
1973 albums
Albums produced by Creed Taylor
Albums arranged by Don Sebesky
Albums recorded at Van Gelder Studio